Pacojet is a kitchen appliance for professionals that micro-purees deep-frozen foods into ultra-fine textures (such as sorbets, ice creams, farces, mousses, soups, concentrates, doughs, masses) without thawing.  Manufactured in Switzerland, the Pacojet is sold worldwide for hotel, restaurant and catering gastronomy.

Overview 
The pacojet system was invented by Wilhelm and Andreas Maurer from Zürich in the 1980s. They sold the patent to the investor Gregor Staub who founded the company PacoJet in 1988 together with two partners from Müswangen (LU) in Switzerland. In 2012, the Pacojet 2 was launched, followed by the Pacojet Junior in 2017 and the Pacojet 2 PLUS in 2018.

In October 2022, to celebrate its 30th anniversary, the Pacojet 4 was released to the public. The Pacojet 4 comes with a large LCD touchscreen providing the user with guidance with an animated assistance feature; as well as a new smart device detection mode to protect against misuse and damage to the Pacojet.

Pacojet AG is headquartered in Zug, Switzerland and is supported by a network of importers and distributors around the globe.

Operation 
Fresh ingredients are placed into the Pacojet beaker and frozen for at least 24 hours at – 22 °C/-8 °F.  The beaker is then attached to the Pacojet machine and the number of portions desired is selected. Its blade spins downward at 2,000 rpm, shaving a micro-thin layer off the top of the block of deep-frozen ingredients. This process is called "pacotizing", a verb coined to describe the unique function of the Pacojet. The Pacojet operates in a sealed mode with a pressure of 1.2 bar / 17 lb. in.

In the press 
In May 2005, chef Shea Gallante referred to the Pacojet as "one of the premiere inventions of the past 10 to 15 years."

In October 2010, Forbes wrote that the Pacojet "has developed a bit of a cult following among tech-obsessed foodies without cash-flow issues… The PacoJet turns the ice cream making process inside out, using a lot of exquisitely calibrated machinery in the process."

In 2011, Modernist Cuisine named Pacojet "must-have tool for the modernist kitchen" in its top-ten list.

References

External links 
 Pacojet

Food preparation appliances